Below is a list of newspapers published in Qatar.

 Al Arab – Arabic daily
 Al Raya – Arabic daily
 Al Sharq – Arabic daily
 Al Watan – Arabic daily
 Lusail – Arabic daily
 Gulf Times – English
 The Peninsula – English
 Qatar Chronicle – English
 Qatar Tribune – English
 Vartamanam – Malayalam daily
 Gulf Madhyamam – Malayalam daily
 Middle East Chandrika – Malayalam daily
 Malayala Manorama – Malayalam daily
 Siraj – Malayalam daily
 Mathrubhumi – Malayalam daily

References 

Qatar
 
Newspapers